KKNL (89.3 MHz) is a radio station licensed to Valentine, Nebraska, and is owned by Community Public Media.

History
KKNL began broadcasting in 2010. It was originally owned by American Family Association, and was an affiliate of American Family Radio's AFR Talk network. KKNL replaced an American Family Radio translator, K207CG, that had broadcast on the same frequency and was first licensed in 1998. The station was taken silent on November 13, 2017. Effective May 21, 2019, the station was sold to Community Public Media for $2,500.

References

External links

Radio stations established in 2010
2010 establishments in Nebraska
KNL